Serxhio is an Albanian given name. Notable people with the name include:

 Serxhio Abdurahmani (born 1992), Albanian footballer
 Serxhio Emini (born 2002), Albanian footballer
 Serxhio Gjonbrati (born 1993), Albanian footballer

Albanian masculine given names